PEN/Faulkner Foundation (est. 1980) is an independent charitable arts foundation which supports the art of writing and encourages readers of all ages. It accomplishes this through a number of programs, including its flagship PEN/Faulkner Award for Fiction, one of the premier fiction awards in America; the PEN/Malamud Award for short fiction; and a number of educational and reading series programs. Since 1983 the Foundation's administration is housed at the Folger Shakespeare Library in Washington, D.C. The Foundation was established in 1980 by National Book Award winner Mary Lee Settle. 
Novelist Robert Stone (b. 1937 – d. 2015) served as the Chairman of the PEN/Faulkner Board of Directors for over thirty years beginning in 1982.

History

Early years 
After her novel Blood Tie won the National Book Award in 1978, Mary Lee Settle (b. 1918 – d. 2005) was invited to be a judge on the 1979 National Book Award's fiction panel. The panel subsequently awarded first prize to Tim O'Brien's Going After Cacciato instead of the bestselling The World According to Garp by John Irving. The New York publishing industry, angered by O'Brien's obscure title winning over Irving's bestseller, canceled its support of the National Book Award and changed the voting rules. In response, in the fall of 1980, Settle and some friends from Charlottesville, VA launched a competing prize which named the "PEN/Faulkner Award". "[Settle's] goal was to establish a national prize that would recognize literary fiction of excellence, an award juried by writers for writers, free of commercial concerns."

Name 
"PEN" is an acronym for Poets, Editors and Novelists and is associated with International PEN. "Faulkner" is a tribute to novelist William Faulkner, one of Settle's main inspirations, who had donated his 1949 Nobel Prize money to fund awards for younger writers including the establishment of the William Faulkner Foundation which existed from 1961 to 1970.

Mission 
The foundation supports readers and writers of all ages and provides targeted resources. The readers are brought into direct contact with the writers. In order to support the reading of students, they also cooperate with teachers.

See also
List of PEN literary awards

References

External links

Foundations based in Washington, D.C.
Arts foundations based in the United States
1980 establishments in the United States

Folger Shakespeare Library